The Coast of the Gods, or La Costa degli Dei in the Italian language, is the name of a scenic section of the Tyrrhenian Sea coastline. It is located in the Province of Vibo Valentia, within Calabria of southwestern Italy.

The cities along the coast, north to south, are: 
Pizzo Calabro
Vibo Valentia
Briatico
Zambrone
Parghelia
Tropea
Ricadi
Joppolo
Nicotera

See also

References

Coasts of Italy
Province of Vibo Valentia
Landforms of the Tyrrhenian Sea
Tourist attractions in Calabria